Oskar Kohlhauser (22 December 1934 – 9 June 2019) was an Austrian footballer. He played in three matches for the Austria national football team from 1956 to 1962.

References

External links
 

1934 births
2019 deaths
Austrian footballers
Austria international footballers
Place of birth missing
Association footballers not categorized by position